Without the King is a 2007 documentary film by Michael Skolnik, an American filmmaker. It follows problems of Swaziland, a landlocked country in southern Africa.

The film features Mswati III, the king of Swaziland, and his daughter and self claimed rapper Princess Sikhanyiso. It shows the angry populace and the country's problems such as a high HIV prevalence, comparing it with the daily life of Mswati III, Africa's last absolute monarch.

References

External links

An Extravagant Ruler of a Modest Kingdom - New York Times Movie review

2007 films
Documentary films about royalty
2007 documentary films
American documentary films
Films set in Eswatini
Politics of Eswatini
2000s American films